Kenneth George Wyatt  (born 4 August 1952) is a former Australian politician who was a member of the House of Representatives from 2010 to 2022, representing the Division of Hasluck for the Liberal Party. He is the first Indigenous Australian elected to the House of Representatives, the first to serve as a government minister, and the first appointed to cabinet. Wyatt was appointed Minister for Aged Care and Minister for Indigenous Health in the Turnbull Government in January 2017, after previously serving as an assistant minister since September 2015. He was elevated to cabinet in May 2019 as Minister for Indigenous Australians in the Morrison government.

At the 2022 federal election Wyatt lost his seat to the Labor candidate Tania Lawrence.

Early life 
Wyatt was born on 4 August 1952 in Bunbury, Western Australia. He is of English, Irish, Indian and Indigenous Australian descent. He was born at Roelands Aboriginal Mission, a former home for young Indigenous children removed from their families. His mother, Mona Abdullah, was one of the Stolen Generations of Aboriginal children removed from their parents and relocated to Roelands, where she met her husband Don. Wyatt's father has Yamatji and Irish ancestry. His mother has Wongi and Noongar ancestry, while her surname, Abdullah, is from an ancestor who migrated from India to be a cameleer, helping lay the trans-Australia telegraph line.

Career 

Prior to entering Parliament, Wyatt served as senior public servant in the fields of Aboriginal health and education. He has held positions as Director of the WA Office of Aboriginal Health as well as a similar post with NSW Health. He was also previously Director of Aboriginal Education with the WA Department of Education.

Politics

2010–2015: backbencher
Wyatt stood for the Liberal Party in the seat of Hasluck in the 2010 election, defeating Labor incumbent Sharryn Jackson.  He won the seat with a 1.4-point swing, and became the first Aboriginal person to be elected to the Australian House of Representatives, and the third elected to the Parliament (behind Neville Bonner and Aden Ridgeway, both Senators).

On 28 September 2010, Wyatt attended the opening of the 43rd Australian Parliament to take up his seat as member for Hasluck. He wore a traditional Booka – a kangaroo skin coat with feathers from a red-tailed black cockatoo, signifying a leadership role in Noongar culture. The cloak had been presented to him by Noongar elders. He made his maiden speech to the Parliament on 29 September and received a standing ovation from both the government and opposition benches as well as from the public galleries.

Wyatt is a member of the Moderate/Modern Liberal faction of the Liberal Party.

2015–2019: frontbencher
On 20 September 2015, Prime Minister Malcolm Turnbull announced that Wyatt would become Assistant Minister for Health, making him the first Indigenous frontbencher in federal parliament. Although his term commenced on 21 September, he was not sworn in with the other ministers as he was overseas, with his ceremony taking place on 30 September. On 18 February 2016, Wyatt's responsibilities were expanded to include aged care in addition to health following a rearrangement in the ministry; and were expanded further when on 24 January 2017 Wyatt was the first indigenous Australian appointed as an Australian Government Minister, with responsibility for the portfolio of Aged Care and the newly established portfolio of Indigenous Health.

2019–2022: Minister for Indigenous Australians
Wyatt retained his marginal seat at the May 2019 federal election with an increased majority. After the election, he was appointed Minister for Indigenous Australians in the Second Morrison Ministry. He is the first Indigenous person to hold the position, and was also elevated to cabinet.

In July 2019, he gave an address to the National Press Club, in which he spoke of the theme of NAIDOC Week 2019: "Voice. Treaty. Truth.". He said that he would "develop and bring forward a consensus option for constitutional recognition to be put to a referendum during the current parliamentary term". He spoke of the development of a local, regional and national voice, and said "with respect to [Indigenous] Treaty, it's important that states and territory jurisdictions take the lead. When you consider the constitution, they are better placed to undertake that work", and with regard to truth-telling, he would "work on approaches to work on how we progress towards truth-telling".

In January 2022, Wyatt announced that the federal government had secured copyright over the Australian Aboriginal Flag, following negotiations with the flag's designer Harold Thomas.
At the 2022 federal election Wyatt lost his seat to the Labor candidate Tania Lawrence.

Indigenous voice to government

On 30 October 2019, Wyatt announced the commencement of a "co-design process" aimed at providing an "Indigenous voice to government". The Senior Advisory Group (SAG) is co-chaired by Professor Tom Calma , Chancellor of the University of Canberra,  and Professor Dr Marcia Langton, Associate Provost at the University of Melbourne, and comprises a total of 20 leaders and experts from across the country. The models for the Voice are being developed in two stages:

First, two groups, one local and regional and the other a national group, will create models aimed at improving local and regional decision-making, and identifying how best federal government can record Indigenous peoples' views and ideas. The groups consist mainly of Indigenous members.
Consultations will be held with Indigenous leaders, communities and stakeholders to refine the models developed in the first stage.

The first meeting of the group was held in Canberra on 13 November 2019.

Awards and honours 
 1996: Member of the Order of Australia for services to Aboriginal health

2001: Centenary Medal in 2001.

Other activities and roles

In 2019, Wyatt delivered the Frank Archibald Memorial Lecture at the University of New England on the topic "Teaching Indigenous Australia – Understanding our past and unlocking our future".

Family 
Wyatt's cousin Cedric Wyatt was a senior public servant and unsuccessful Liberal candidate for federal parliament. Cedric's son Ben Wyatt is a former Labor politician who served as the Treasurer of Western Australia from 2017 until March 2021. Ben was also Western Australia's Aboriginal Affairs Minister which at the time made Ken, as Indigenous Australians Minister, his federal portfolio counterpart.

Footnotes

References

External links 

|-

|-

|-

1952 births
Australian people of English descent
Australian people of Indian descent
Australian people of Irish descent
Indigenous Australian politicians
Liberal Party of Australia members of the Parliament of Australia
Living people
Members of the Australian House of Representatives
Members of the Australian House of Representatives for Hasluck
Members of the Order of Australia
Noongar people
People from Bunbury, Western Australia
Recipients of the Centenary Medal
Turnbull Government
21st-century Australian politicians
Government ministers of Australia
Morrison Government